Firuz Husayn was an Iranian aristocrat, who was a key figure in the rebellion of Abd al-Rahman ibn Muhammad ibn al-Ash'ath, which lasted from 700 to 703.

Biography 
A native of Sistan, Firuz Husayn belonged to a "munificent and well-known" family, which it traced its descent back to the Sasanian era. Firuz Husayn is first mentioned as a client and secretary of Husayn ibn Abd-Allah al-Anbari of the Banu Tamim. He later adopted his patron's name, hence the name "Husayn". Firuz Husayn later became a client of Abd al-Rahman ibn Muhammad ibn al-Ash'ath. In 700, Abd al-Rahman ibn Muhammad ibn al-Ash'ath rebelled against the Umayyad Caliphate, with Firuz Husayn leading the rebels. This made the Arab statesman al-Hajjaj ibn Yusuf put a price (10,000 dirhams) on Firuz Husayn's head. After Ibn al-Ash'ath was defeated in 703, Firuz Husayn retreated to Khurasan, but was captured by Yazid ibn al-Muhallab and sent to al-Hajjaj, who had him tortured to death.

Sources 

7th-century births
703 deaths
8th-century Iranian people
Rebellions against the Umayyad Caliphate
8th-century executions by the Umayyad Caliphate